Michael Anthony Kleinhenz (November 14, 1951 – July 11, 2008) was an American voice actor who frequently participated in translation and dubbing of Japanese anime. His voice also appeared in national TV and radio advertisements and local advertisements in the Houston area.

History
Mike was born in Cincinnati, Ohio. He graduated from Pascack Valley High School in Hillsdale, New Jersey in 1969 and from the University of Cincinnati in 1974 with a B.A. degree in Radio and TV Broadcasting. After college he settled in Houston, Texas.  He married Sydnie Diane Meltzer in 1981 (divorced 2003) and raised five sons.

In college, Mike led the Bearcats defensive line and was selected to play in the Ohio Shrine Bowl. After graduation, he tried out with the San Francisco Giants and played pre-season football for the Houston Oilers. Shortly before his first son was born, Mike competed in the 35K racewalk at the US Olympic Festival. He remained active throughout his life.  His sports interests included football, basketball, baseball, fast-pitch softball, mountain biking, running, disc golf and snagging.

At home, Mike was a gifted singer and guitar player. Outside of the house, he was more easily recognized for his role in dubbing Japanese anime and as the voice in countless local and national commercials.

Kleinhenz suffered a heart attack and died on July 11, 2008.

Roles 

 All Purpose Cultural Cat Girl Nuku Nuku DASH! as Executive B
 Bubblegum Crisis Tokyo 2040 as Doctor
 Chrono Crusade as Ricardo Hendric
 Crying Freeman as Yakuza Boss
 Excel Saga as Kabapu
 Full Metal Panic!, The Second Raid, and Fumoffu as Andrei Kalinin
 Gantz as Goro Suzuki
 Gasaraki as Meth/Nozomi Takayama/Regent
 Kaleido Star as Hamilton
 Kino's Journey as Trader C (Ep. 2)
 Lady Death: The Movie as Lucifer, Matthias
 Madlax as Friday Monday
 Megazone 23 as Director General
 Najica Blitz Tactics as Jin Majima
 Neon Genesis Evangelion (Director's Cut) as SEELE
 Noir as Legrand
 Parasite Dolls as Takahashi
 Princess Tutu as The Raven
 RahXephon as Shirow Watari
 Samurai Gun as Tavern Master
 Slayers Return as Father
 Sorcerer on the Rocks as Narrator/Icarus
 Spriggan as Fattman
 Street Fighter II V as Bison (ADV Dub replacing Markham Anderson)
 Those Who Hunt Elves as Judge
 Ushio and Tora as Bully/Ishikui/Motorist/Newscaster

References

External links
 
 

1951 births
2008 deaths
American male voice actors
Male actors from Cincinnati
People from Houston
University of Cincinnati alumni
20th-century American male actors